Listed below are the dates and results for the 2006 FIFA World Cup qualification rounds for North, Central America and the Caribbean. A total of 34 teams took part (out of 35 eligible – only Puerto Rico declined to participate), competing for 3.5 places in the World Cup.

The qualification process was divided in four stages. In the first stage, the 34 teams were divided in 10 groups of three teams each and two groups of two teams each. Groups with three teams had two rounds, with the best ranked team according to FIFA in each group entering the competition in the second round. In each group, teams were paired 2-by-2 and played home-and-away matches.

The 12 winners of the second stage advanced to the third stage, where they were divided into three groups of four teams each. Teams in each group would play against each other home-and-away, and the two teams with most points in each group would advance to the Final Round.

In the fourth stage, the six teams were put in a single group, and played against each other home-and-away. The three teams with most points qualified to the World Cup. The fourth placed team advanced to the AFC–CONCACAF play-off against the winner of a play-off between third placed teams in the Third Round of Asia.

Format
The First and Second Rounds reduced the 34 entrants to 24 and 12 teams, respectively. The remaining 12 teams were then placed into three Third Round groups of four, with the top two teams in each group advancing to the Fourth and final qualification group. The Third Round began in August 2004 and ended in November 2004. The top three teams from the Fourth Round group of six (held from February 2005 to October 2005) qualified for the 2006 FIFA World Cup. The fourth-placed team competed in a home-and-away play-off against the fifth-placed team from Asia.

First round

|-

|}

Second round

|-

|}

Third round

Group 1

Group 2

Group 3

Fourth round

United States finished ahead of Mexico based on results between tied teams which were the first tiebreaker. 
Mexico, United States and Costa Rica advanced to the 2006 FIFA World Cup.
Trinidad and Tobago advanced to the AFC-CONCACAF play-off.

Inter-confederation play-offs

The Fourth Round fourth-placed team then played the fifth-placed team of the AFC qualifying group, Bahrain, in a home-and-away play-off. The winner of this play-off qualified for the 2006 FIFA World Cup finals.

Qualified teams
The following four teams from CONCACAF qualified for the final tournament.

1 Bold indicates champions for that year. Italic indicates hosts for that year.

Goalscorers
There were 378 goals scored in 112 matches (including 2 international play-offs), for an average of 3.38 goals per match.
14 goals

 Jared Borgetti

12 goals

 Stern John

11 goals

 Jaime Lozano

10 goals

 Carlos Ruiz
 Francisco Fonseca

8 goals

 Paulo Wanchope

7 goals

 John Barry Nusum
 Ian Lake
 Landon Donovan
 Eddie Johnson

6 goals

 Marlon King
 Roberto Brown

5 goals

 Carlos Hernández
 Lester Moré
 Luis Ernesto Pérez
 Julio Dely Valdés

4 goals

 Damon Ming
 Dwayne De Rosario
 Amado Guevara
 David Suazo
 Dwight Pezzarossi
 Adolfo Bautista
 Sergio Santana
 Luis Tejada
 George Isaac
 Shandel Samuel
 Marlon Felter
 DaMarcus Beasley
 Brian McBride

3 goals

 Ralph Bean
 Khano Smith
 Rónald Gómez
 Álvaro Saborío
 Vincent Casimir
 Johnny Descouines
 Héctor Altamirano
 Sinha
 Errol McFarlane

2 goals

 Maurice Escalona
 Shannon Burgess
 Jim Brennan
 Tomasz Radzinski
 Walter Centeno
 Roy Myrie
 Juan Contrera
 Kervin Severino
 Alfredo Pacheco
 Víctor Velásquez
 Ricky Charles
 Jason Roberts
 Juan Carlos Plata
 Guillermo Ramírez
 Gonzalo Romero
 Jean-Philippe Peguero
 Jesús Arellano
 Rafael Márquez
 Daniel Osorno
 Brutil Hosé
 Emilio Palacios
 Keith Gumbs
 Calum Willock
 Titus Elva
 Sheldon Emmanuel
 Earl Jean
 Jarvin Skeete
 Renson Haynes
 Kendall Velox
 Gordon Kinsaini
 Patrick Zinhagel
 Angus Eve
 Brian Ching
 Eddie Lewis
 Steve Ralston

1 goal

 Quentin Clarke
 Winston Roberts
 Damani Horton
 Gregory Goodridge
 Kenroy Skinner
 Nesley Jean
 Clevon Hill
 Rohann Simons
 Otis Steede
 Meshach Wade
 Jason de Vos
 Atiba Hutchinson
 Kevin McKenna
 Paul Peschisolido
 Thomas Elliot
 Rolando Fonseca
 Andy Herron
 Douglas Sequeira
 Alonso Solís
 William Sunsing
 Whayne Wilson
 Alain Cervantes
 Luis Marten
 Kelly Peters
 José Martínez
 Jorge Rodríguez
 Anthony Augustine
 Nigel Bishop
 Byron Bubb
 Anthony Modeste
 Kennedy Phillip
 Dennis Rennie
 Freddy García
 Élmer Ponciano
 Selvyn Ponciano
 Mario Rafael Rodríguez
 Edwin Villatoro
 Carey Harris
 Roody Lormera
 Corriolan Wadson
 Edgar Álvarez
 Julio César de León
 Iván Guerrero
 Saul Martínez
 Carlos Pavón
 Danilo Turcios
 Ian Goodison
 Micah Hyde
 Damani Ralph
 Theodore Whitmore
 Andy Williams
 Duilio Davino
 Guillermo Franco
 Ramón Morales
 David Oteo
 Francisco Palencia
 Pavel Pardo
 Eugene Martha
 Rocky Siberie
 Rudel Calero
 Felipe Baloy
 Alberto Blanco
 José Luis Garcés
 Ricardo Phillips
 Darryl Gomez
 Austin Huggins
 Adam Newton
 Andy Baptiste
 Elijah Joseph
 Rodney Jack
 Marlon James
 Gino Brandon
 Carlos Loswijk
 Dennis Purperhart
 Clifton Sandvliet
 Marvin Andrews
 Carlos Edwards
 Cornell Glen
 Russell Latapy
 Dennis Lawrence
 Jerren Nixon
 Hector Sam
 Jason Scotland
 Scott Sealy
 Densill Theobald
 Carlos Bocanegra
 Cobi Jones
 Kyle Martino
 Taylor Twellman
 Greg Vanney
 Josh Wolff

1 own goal

 Gustavo Adolfo Cabrera (playing against Mexico)
 Carlos Alonso (playing against Saint Vincent and the Grenadines)
 Felipe Baloy (playing against Guatemala)
 José Anthony Torres (playing against the United States)
 Alexander Riley (playing against Trinidad and Tobago)
 Marvin Andrews (playing against Guatemala)
 Lawrence Harvey (playing against Haiti)

References

 
CONCACAF
FIFA World Cup qualification (CONCACAF)

fr:Phase qualificative de la Coupe du monde de football 2006#Amérique du Nord, centrale et Caraïbes
lb:Foussball-Weltmeeschterschaft 2006/Qualifikatioun#Nord- a Mëttelamerika